Oncojapyx is a genus of diplurans in the family Japygidae.

Species
 Oncojapyx basilewskyi Pagés, 1952
 Oncojapyx machadoi Silvestri, 1948
 Oncojapyx peramatus Pagés, 1952

References

Diplura